Grace Kathleen Elizabeth Shaw (born 25 September 1998), known professionally as Mallrat, is an Australian musician, singer, and rapper from Brisbane. Mallrat has released three EPs: Uninvited (2016), In the Sky (2018) and Driving Music (2019). She also released her full-length debut studio album titled Butterfly Blue (2022) in May 2022 to critical acclaim.
In 2019, her tracks "Groceries" and "UFO" placed at number 7 and 70, respectively,  in the 2018 Triple J Hottest 100, in 2020, "Charlie" and "Nobody's Home" placed at number 3 and 59, respectively, in the 2019 Triple J Hottest 100 and in 2021, "Rockstar" placed 13 in the 2020 Triple J Hottest 100.

Early life
Grace Kathleen Elizabeth Shaw was born on 25 September 1998, in Brisbane. She attended Ascot State School from 2004 to 2010 and Clayfield College from 2011 to 2015. Shaw began writing music as a high school student, as she started making music when she was 11 years old, first releasing music in 2014.

Music career

2015–2016: Early years
The name 'Mallrat' is derived from the 2012 track "Mallrats (La La La)" by American punk band the Orwells. Shaw released her official debut single, "Suicide Blonde" produced by Tigerilla, under the name Mallrat on 23 July 2015. This single would later be included on her debut EP, Uninvited, which she recorded while in her last year of high school.

2017–2021: Signing onto labels, In the Sky and Driving Music

Mallrat performed at Splendour in the Grass in 2017, and alongside artists such as Peking Duk and Allday. She then signed on with Canadian label Nettwerk Records and Australian label Dew Process. In early 2017, Mallrat supported Peking Duk on their 'Clowntown' tour. In October 2017, Mallrat released her single "Better" followed by "UFO" featuring Allday in February 2018 and "Groceries" in June 2018. All three tracks featured on her second EP, In the Sky which was released in June 2018. In 2018–2019, Mallrat supported Maggie Rogers in Europe on her 'Heard It In A Past Life' World Tour. In January 2019, Mallrat announced her headline national tour with Basenji, Kota Banks, and Nyne as supports. Later that month "Groceries" and "UFO" placed at number 7 and 70, respectively, in the 2018 Triple J Hottest 100.

In August 2019, Mallrat released "Charlie" the lead single from her third EP Driving Music which was released in September 2019. The EP peaked at number 10 on the ARIA Charts. In December 2019, NME included "Uninvited", a song from the 2016 album Uninvited, as one of the greatest songs of the 2010s decade, at number 91. In January 2020, "Charlie" and "Nobody's Home" featuring Basenji placed at number 3 and 59, respectively, in the 2019 Triple J Hottest 100. In January 2021, Mallrat's single "Rockstar" placed 13 in the 2020 Triple J Hottest 100.

2022: Butterfly Blue

On 4 February 2022 Mallrat released "Your Love". On 2 March 2022, Mallrat released "Teeth" and announced the release of her debut studio album, Butterfly Blue. The album peaked at number 6 on the ARIA Charts.

Musical style
Shaw lists her influences as a blend of bands and artists including Grimes, Skrillex, Sophie, Courtney Barnett, and her most prominent influence, Allday.

Discography

Studio albums

Extended plays

Singles

As lead artist

As featured artist

Other charted songs

Other appearances

Awards and nominations

APRA Awards
The APRA Awards are several award ceremonies run in Australia by the Australasian Performing Right Association (APRA) to recognise composing and song writing skills, sales and airplay performance by its members annually. 

! 
|-
| 2020 
| "Charlie" by Mallrat (with Leroy Clampitt)
| Song of the Year
| 
| 
|-
| 2021 || Grace Shaw  Mallrat || Breakthrough Songwriter of the Year||  || 
|-

ARIA Music Awards
The ARIA Music Awards is an annual awards ceremony that recognises excellence, innovation, and achievement across all genres of Australian music. Mallrat has received two nominations.

|-
|rowspan="2"| 2020
| Driving Music
| Breakthrough Artist – Release
| 
|-
| "Charlie"
| Song of the Year
|

MTV Europe Music Awards
The MTV Europe Music Awards is an award presented by Viacom International Media Networks to honour artists and music in pop culture.

|-
| 2019
| Herself
| Best Australian Act
| 
|-

National Live Music Awards
The National Live Music Awards (NLMAs) are a broad recognition of Australia's diverse live industry, celebrating the success of the Australian live scene. The awards commenced in 2016.

|-
| National Live Music Awards of 2019
| Mallrat
| Live Pop Act of the Year
| 
|-
| National Live Music Awards of 2020
| Mallrat
| Queensland Act Voice of the Year
| 
|-

South Australian Music Awards
The South Australian Music Awards (previously known as the Fowler's Live Music Awards) are annual awards that exist to recognise, promote and celebrate excellence in the South Australian contemporary music industry. They commenced in 2012.
 
|-
| 2017
| "Better" (Directed by Rory Pippan – Young Black Youth)
| Best Music Video
| 
|-

Vanda & Young Global Songwriting Competition
The Vanda & Young Global Songwriting Competition is an annual competition that "acknowledges great songwriting whilst supporting and raising money for Nordoff-Robbins" and is coordinated by Albert Music and APRA AMCOS. It commenced in 2009.

|-
| 2018
| "Better"
| Unpublished prize
| 
|-

References

Australian musicians
Living people
1998 births
Australian women pop singers
Musicians from Brisbane
21st-century Australian singers
Dew Process artists
Nettwerk Records artists
21st-century Australian women singers